The Syracuse University School of Education is the education school of Syracuse University in Syracuse, New York. Founded in 1906, the school is dedicated to training highly skilled and knowledgeable practitioners, teachers, administrators, counselors, and scholars. The school offers bachelor's, master's, and doctoral degree programs, as well as Certificates of Advanced Study, in elementary education, higher education, special education, school counseling, and educational leadership.

History 
Prior to the establishment of the school, Syracuse University offered classes through the Department of Philosophy to train students interested in becoming teachers. In 1906, Margaret Olivia Slocum Sage, a philanthropist, former teacher, and wife of financier Russell Sage, gifted the now demolished Yates Castle along with a generous endowment to the university and officially established the Margaret Olivia Slocum Teachers’ College of Syracuse University.

After decades of growth, the school was renamed Syracuse University School of Education under the leadership of Dean Harry Ganders in 1934. 

In 1946, the school pioneered a Special Education program that applied progressive views to teaching people with various disabilities.

Academics

Academic departments 
The school is organized into seven academic departments specializing in their respective field of education.

 Counseling & Human Services
 Cultural Foundations of Education
 Higher Education
 Instructional Design, Development & Evaluation
 Reading & Language Arts
 Teaching & Leadership

Undergraduate programs 
The school offers several bachelor's degrees in education, including English Education, Inclusive Elementary and Special Education, Mathematics Education, Music Education, Science Education, Selected Studies in Education, and Social Studies Education.

Graduate programs 
The school offers a wide range of graduate programs beyond training the next generation of teachers. For example, it currently provides master's degrees in Childhood Education, Clinical Mental Health Counseling, Higher Education, Literacy Education, Music Education, and School Counseling, as well as doctoral degrees in Counseling and Counselor Education, Cultural Foundations of Education, Educational Leadership, and Instructional Design, Development, and Evaluation.

References

External links
 

Education
1906 establishments in New York (state)
Educational institutions established in 1906
Schools of education in New York (state)
Schools of education in the United States